2014 North American winter may refer to:
2013–14 North American winter
2014–15 North American winter